Tagirkent-Kazmalyar is a rural locality (a selo) and the administrative centre of Tagirkent-Kazmalyarsky Selsoviet, Magaramkentsky District, Republic of Dagestan, Russia. The population was 3,005 as of 2010. There are 14 streets.

Geography 
Tagirkent-Kazmalyar is located 33 km northeast of Magaramkent (the district's administrative centre) by road. Khtun-Kazmalyar and Samur are the nearest rural localities.

Nationalities 
Lezgins live there.

References 

Rural localities in Magaramkentsky District